Ali Massoud Ansari FRSE (born 24 November 1967 in Rome) is the Professor in Modern History with reference to the Middle East at the University of St Andrews in Scotland, where he is also the founding director of the Institute for Iranian Studies.

Education and career
Ansari was educated at Col.Brown Cambridge School Dehara Dun, Royal Russell School, University College London (BA), King's College London (MA), and obtained his PhD from the University of London's School of Oriental and African Studies (SOAS).

He is also an Associate Fellow at Chatham House and sits on the Governing Council of the British Institute of Persian Studies (BIPS). He is a regular speaker at conferences and events regarding Iran, including "Iran's New Parliament" at the New America Foundation. His work appears in The Guardian, The Independent, and the New Statesman, among other publications.

Honours 
In March 2016 Ansari was elected a Fellow of the Royal Society of Edinburgh, Scotland's National Academy for science and letters.

Family life 
Ansari is the son of Mariam Dariabegi and Mohammad Ali Massoud Ansari, cousin of Farah Pahlavi.  He married Marjon Esfandiary in 2010, after which he had a celebration held at Chatham House.

Selected bibliography
Iran, Islam and Democracy: the Politics of Managing Change (2000)
Modern Iran Since 1921: the Pahlavis and After  (2003)
Confronting Iran: The Failure of American Foreign Policy and the Roots of Mistrust (2006)
Iran Under Ahmadinejad (2008)
The Politics of Nationalism in Modern Iran (2012)
Iran: A Very Short Introduction (2014)
Iran’s Constitutional Revolution of 1906 and Narratives of the Enlightenment (2016)
Iran, Islam and Democracy: The Politics of Managing Change, 3rd Edition (2019)

References

External links
 
 Profile at the University of St Andrews Website
 Profile at the Chatham House Website 

1967 births
Living people
Alumni of University College London
Alumni of King's College London
Alumni of SOAS University of London
British historians
Academics of the University of St Andrews
Iranologists
British people of Iranian descent
Chatham House people